The Konkani people are an Indo-Aryan ethnolinguistic group native to the Konkan region of the Indian subcontinent who speak various dialects of the Konkani language. Konkani is the state language of Goa and also spoken by populations in coastal Karnataka, coastal Maharashtra, and Kerala. Other Konkani speakers are found in Gujarat state.
A large percentage of Konkani people are bilingual.

Etymology
Different authorities explain etymology of this word differently. Some include:
Koṇ meaning top of the mountain.
Name of aboriginal mother goddess, which is sometimes sanskritised to mean goddess Renuka.
Thus the name Konkane, comes from the word , which means the people of Konkan.

Sub-ethnic groups

Endonyms

The plural form is Konkane or Konkani. In Goa Konkano now refers only to Hindus, and Konkani Catholics do not address themselves as Konkanos as they were banned by the Portuguese from referring to themselves this way. Saraswat Brahmins of Canara refer to the Konkanis as  /. This literally means our tongue or people speaking our tongue. Sometimes  can be used in the Goan context to mean people from my community.

Exonyms
Many of the colonial documents mention them as the Concanees, Canarians, Concanies.

History

Prehistory
The then prehistoric region consisting of Modern Goa and some parts of Konkan adjoining Goa were inhabited by the Homo sapiens in Upper paleolithic and Mesolithic phase i.e. 8000–6000 BC. The rock engraving in many places along the coast has proven the existence of hunter-gathers. Nothing much is known about these earliest settlers.
Figures of mother goddess and many other motifs have been recovered which do not really shed light on the ancient culture and language. Traces of Shamanic religion have been found in Goa.

It is believed that tribes of Austric origin like Kols, Mundaris, Kharvis may have settled Goa and Konkan during the Neolithic period, living on hunting, fishing and a primitive form of agriculture since 3500 BC. According to Goan historian Anant Ramakrishna Dhume, the Gauda and Kunbi and other such castes are modern descendants of ancient Mundari tribes. In his work he mentions several words of Mundari origin in the Konkani language. He also elaborates on the deities worshiped by the ancient tribes, their customs, methods of farming and its overall impact on modern day Konkani society. They were in a Neolithic stage of primitive culture, and they were food-gatherers rather. The tribe known as the Konkas, from whom is derived the name of the region, Kongvan or Konkan with the other mentioned tribes formed reportedly the earliest settlers in the territory. Agriculture was not fully developed at this stage, and was just shaping up. The Kols and Mundaris might have been using stone and wood implements as iron implements were used by the megalithic tribes as late as 1200 BC. The Kol tribe is believed to have migrated from Gujarat. During this period worship of mother goddess in the form of anthill or Santer, was started. Anthill is called as Roen (Konkani:रोयण), this word has been derived from the Austric word Rono meaning with holes. The later Indo-Aryan and Dravidian settlers also adopted anthill worship, which was translated to Santara in Prakrit by them.

The later period
The first wave of Vedic people came and settled from Northern India in then Konkan region. Some of them might have been followers of Vedic religion. They were known to speak the earliest form of Prakrit or Vedic Sanskrit vernacular. This migration of the northerners is mainly attributed to the drying up of the Sarasvati River in Northern India. Many historians claim only Gaud Saraswat Brahmins and few of the other Brahmins to be their descendants. This hypothesis is not authoritative according to some. Balakrishna Dattaram Kamat Satoskar a renowned Goan Indologist and historian, in his work Gomantak prakruti ani sanskruti, Volume I explains that the original Sarasvat tribe consisted of people of all the folds who followed the Vedic fourfold system and not just Brahmins, as the caste system was not fully developed then, and did not play an important role.(see Gomantak prakruti ani sanskruti, Volume I).

The second wave of Indo-Aryans occurred sometime between 1700 to 1450 BC. This second wave migration was accompanied by Dravidians from the Deccan plateau. A wave of Kusha or Harappan people a Lothal probably around 1600 BC to escape submergence of their civilisation which thrived on sea-trade. The admixture of several cultures, customs, religions, dialects and beliefs, led to revolutionary change in the formation of early Konkani society.

The classical period
The Maurya era is marked with migrations from the East, advent of Buddhism and different Prakrit vernaculars. Buddhist Graeco-Bactrians settled Goa during the Satavahana rule, similarly a mass migration of Brahmins happened from the north, whom the kings had invited to perform Vedic sacrifices.

The advent of Western Satrap rulers also led to many Scythian migrations, which later gave its way to the Bhoja kings.
According to Vithal Raghavendra Mitragotri, many Brahmins and Vaishyas had come with Yadava Bhojas from the North (see A socio-cultural history of Goa from the Bhojas to the Vijayanagara). The Yadava Bhojas patronised Buddhism and settled many Buddhist converts of Greek and Persian origin.

The Abhirs, Chalukyas, Rashtrakutas, Shilaharas ruled the then Konkan-Goa for several years which was responsible for many changes in the society. Later The powerful Kadambas of Goa, came to power. During their rule, the society underwent radical transition. Close contact with the Arabs, Turks, introduction of Jainism, patronising Shaivism, use of Sanskrit and Kannada, the overseas trade had an overwhelming impact on the people.

13th–19th century AD

Turkic rule
In 1350 CE, Goa was conquered by the Bahmani Sultanate of Turkic origin. However, in 1370, the Vijayanagar Empire, a resurgent Hindu empire situated at modern day Hampi, reconquered the area. The Vijayanagar rulers held on to Goa for nearly 100 years, during which its harbours were important landing places for Arabian horses on their way to Hampi to strengthen the Vijaynagar cavalry. In 1469, however, Goa was reconquered, by the Bahmani Sultans. When this dynasty broke up in 1492, Goa became a part of Adil Shah's Bijapur Sultanate, who made Goa Velha their second capital.
The Bahamanis demolished many temples, and forced the Hindus to convert to Islam. To avoid this religious persecution, several Goans families fled to the neighbourhood kingdom of Soonda.

Portuguese rule of Goa
The Portuguese conquest of Goa occurred in 1510 under the leadership of Afonso de Albuquerque and with the assistance of the local Hindus led by Timoji. The Christianisation of Goa and its simultaneous Lusitanisation soon followed. 

The Goa Inquisition was established in 1560, briefly suppressed from 1774 to 1778, and finally abolished in 1812. Its main aim was to investigate New Christians for heresy, and to preserve the Catholic faith. Crypto-Jews who emigrated to Goa from the Iberian Peninsula to escape the Spanish Inquisition and the Portuguese Inquisition, were the main cause behind the launch of the Goa Inquisition.  Some 16,202 persons were brought to trial by the Inquisition. 57 were sentenced to death and executed in person, another 64 were burned in effigy. Of these, 105 of them were men and 16 women. The rest of those convicted were subjected to lesser punishments or penanced. Those sentenced to various punishments totalled 4,046, out of whom 3,034 were men and 1,012 were women.

Seventy-one autos da fe were recorded. In the first few years alone, over 4000 people were arrested. According to the Chronista de Tissuary (Chronicles of Tiswadi), the last auto da fe was held in Goa on 7 February 1773.

The Inquisition was set as a tribunal, headed by an Inquisitor, sent to Goa from Portugal and was assisted by two more judges. These three judges were answerable only to the Portuguese Inquisition in Lisbon and handed down punishments according to the Inquisition Laws. The Laws filled 230 pages and the palace where the Inquisition was conducted was known as the Big House and the Inquisition proceedings were always conducted behind closed shutters and closed doors, to prevent outside interference while the accused was being interrogated.

In 1567, the campaign of destroying temples in Bardez was completed after the majority of the local Hindus had converted to Christianity. At the end of it, 300 Hindu temples were destroyed. Laws were enacted from 4 December 1567 prohibiting the public performance of Hindu rituals such as marriages, sacred thread wearing and cremation. All persons above 15 years of age were compelled to listen to Christian preaching, failing which they were punished. In 1583, Hindu temples at Assolna and Cuncolim were also destroyed by the Portuguese after the majority of the locals had converted.

One person convicted by the Goa Inquisition was a French physician-cum-spy named Charles Dellon. He published a book in 1687 describing his experiences, titled Relation de l'Inquisition de Goa.

The remaining few Hindus who wanted to keep their Hindu religion did so, by emigrating to the neighbouring territories that continued to be ruled by Bijapur, where these Hindus again had to pay jizya tax.

Ironically, the Inquisition was a compelling factor for the emigration of some Portuguese immigrant soldiers who, although raised Roman Catholic, wanted to lead a Hindu-style way of life with multiple native Hindu concubines. These men went on to seek their fortunes as mercenaries in the courts of different Indian kings, where their services were employed usually as gunners or cavalrymen.

Impact on culture and language
Konkani language had originally been studied and Roman Konkani promoted by Catholic missionaries in Goa (e.g. Thomas Stephens) as a communication medium during the 16th century. The Maratha threat was compounded by their attacks on native Catholics and destruction of local churches during their repeated attacks on Goa in the 17th century. This led the Portuguese government to initiate a positive programme for the suppression of Konkani in Goa, in order to make native Catholic Goans identify fully with the Portuguese Empire. As a result, Konkani was suppressed and rendered unprivileged in Goa by the enforcement of Portuguese.
Urged by the Franciscans, the Portuguese viceroy forbade the use of Konkani on 27 June 1684 and further decreed that within three years, the local people in general would speak the Portuguese language and use it in all their contacts and contracts made in Portuguese territories. The penalties for violation would be imprisonment. The decree was confirmed by the king on 17 March 1687. However, according to the Inquisitor António Amaral Coutinho's letter to the Portuguese monarch João V in 1731, these draconian measures were unsuccessful.

The fall of the "Province of the North" (which included Bassein, Chaul and Salsette) in 1739 led to the suppression of Konkani gaining new strength. On 21 November 1745, the Archbishop of Goa, Lourenço de Santa Maria e Melo (O.F.M.), decreed that fluency in Portuguese was mandatory for the Goan applicants to the priesthood, and also for all their immediate relatives (men as well as women). This language fluency would be confirmed via rigorous examinations by ordained priests. Furthermore, the Bamonns and Chardos were required to learn Portuguese within six months, failing which they would be denied the right to marriage. The Jesuits, who had historically been the greatest advocates of Konkani, were expelled from Goa by the  Marquis of Pombal in 1761. In 1812, the Archbishop decreed that children should be prohibited from speaking Konkani in schools. In 1847, this rule was extended to seminaries. In 1869, Konkani was completely banned in schools until Portugal became a Republic in 1910.

The result of this linguistic displacement was that Konkani in Goa became the língua de criados (language of the servants). Hindu and Catholic elites turned to Marathi and Portuguese, respectively. Ironically, Konkani is at present the 'cement' that binds all Goans across caste, religion and class and is affectionately termed Konkani Mai (Mother Konkani). Due to negative propaganda from the Maharashtrawadi Gomantak Party, Marathi was made the official language of Goa following the Annexation of Goa in 1961. Konkani received official recognition only in February 1987, when the Indian government recognised Konkani as the official language of Goa.

Notable people

Oscar Fernandes -  Indian politician
Dayananda Pai -  Indian billionaire real estate developer, philanthropist and educationist
Padmini Kohlapure - Actress
Amrita Rao - Actress
Ileana D'Cruz - Actress
Jayshree Gadkar - Actress
K.V. Kamath - Chief of the New Development Bank of BRICS countries
Ravindra Kelekar - Freedom fighter,  author
Prakash Padukone - Ace Badminton Player; World rank#1 in 1980
Isha Koppikar - Actress
Terence Lewis - Choreographer
Sudesh Lotlikar - Poet and producer/director
Narayana Purushothama Mallaya - Author
Anant Nag - Actor
Shankar Nag - Actor
Jagannath Shankarseth - Philanthropist and educationalist
Pundalik Naik - Poet,  writer, novelist
Nakul - Actor
Ajit Pai - Chairman of the United States Federal Communications Commission
Anant Pai - Educationalist and pioneer of Indian comics
 TMA Pai - Well known for building university town of Manipal
Ramesh Pai - Banker & educationalist
 Mohandas Pai - Padma shri recipient
Radhika Pandit - Actress
 Hortencio Pereira - Theatre Artist, Writer, Director, Singer & Lyricist
 Suresh Prabhu - Former cabinet minister in Modi's first ministry
Dilip Sardesai - Former Indian cricketer
Varsha Usgaonkar - Actress
Manohar Parrikar - Former Defense Minister of India & Former Chief Minister of Goa
Sachin Pilgaonkar - Actor
Balshastri Jambhekar - Journalist
Vithal V. Kamat - Hotel industry businessman
Deepika Padukone - Actress
Kishori Amonkar - Indian Classical vocalist
Bhumi Pednekar - Actress
Aadesh Bandekar - Actor and TV Host
T.V.R. Shenoy  - Journalist, won the Padma Bushan in 2003

See also
Karnataka ethnic groups
Udupi
Malvani Konkani

Notes and references

Bibliography
 Hindu Temples and deities by Rui Pereira Gomes
 Bharatiya Samaj Vighatak Jati Varna Vyavastha by P.P. Shirodkar, published by Kalika Prakashan Vishwast Mandal
 Gazetteer of the Union Territory Goa, Daman and Diu: district gazetteer by Vithal Trimbak Gune, Goa, Daman and Diu (India). Gazetteer Dept, Published by Gazetteer Dept., Govt. of the Union Territory of Goa, Daman and Diu, 1979
 The Village Communities. A Historical and legal Perspective – Souza de, Carmo. In: Borges, Charles J. 2000: 112 and Velinkar, Joseph. Village Communities in Goa and their Evolution
 Caste and race in India by Govind Sadashiv Ghurye
 The cultural history of Goa from 10000 B.C.-1352 A.D.   by Anant Ramkrishna Sinai Dhume

External links

History of Konkani Muslims of Coastal Maharashtra
The Kanara Saraswat Association 
About the roots of the Konkani speaking Saraswat Brahmin community
History of Mangalorean Konkani Christians
A Welfare organisation of Konkani Muslim or Kokni Muslim in the Gulf
Daivajna Community Website
Origins of Konkani Language
Online Manglorean Konkani Dictionary Project

 
Ethnic groups in India
Indo-Aryan peoples
Linguistic groups of the constitutionally recognised official languages of India
Social groups of Goa
Social groups of Karnataka
Social groups of Maharashtra
Konkani
Mangalorean society